Ikhtilāf is an Islamic scholarly religious disagreement, and is hence the opposite of ijma.

Direction in Quran
After Muhammad's death, the Verse of Obedience stipulates that disagreements or Ikhtilaf are to be arbitrated by referring to the Quran and Sunnah. While those in authority are absent from arbitration here, they are mentioned elsewhere in verse 4:83, which includes the passage, "And whenever tidings come unto them, whether of security or fear, they spread it about, whereas had they referred it to the Messenger and to those in authority among them, those of them whose task it is to investigate would have known it." Lalani attributes to the Twelver Imam al-Baqir this argument, which also appears in al-Jami' li-ahkam al-Quran by the Sunni al-Qurtubi.

According to Verse of Obedience,  if there is any debate or ikhtilaf about any religious matter or rule, then Quran orders to retern to Quran and Sunnah to dismiss ikhtilaf and to avoid taqlid.

In the Hadith (Sayings of the Prophet) 
The hadith of Muhammad which states that "Allah will ensure my ummah will never collude en-masse upon error" have been mentioned in the books of Tirmidhi, Ibn Majah, Musnah Ahmad, and Darimi. This is often quoted as the primary proof of Ijma as well as rejection of ikhtilaf from the Hadith from the Sunni View.

Similar hadiths are often cited as a proof for the validity of ijma and dissmiss of ikhtilaf as well.

Scholar's opinions
Some Islamic scholars teach that when there is a scholarly disagreement on a certain issue, it is impermissible to condemn a person who follows a position that is different from one's own. The requirement to command the right and forbid the wrong does not apply when there is ikhtilaf upon a position.

However there is doubt as to the authenticity of this statement as to whether it truly came from Muhammad or not. People often quote this statement as a hadith, but it is not mentioned in the six authentic collections of hadith and its chain of narrators is also not known. There are various versions of this statement. In some versions it is rendered: "The difference of opinions among my Companions is a mercy for you"; alternately, it is rendered as: "The difference of opinions of my Companions is a mercy for my Ummah". Many scholars of hadith consider both of these versions as weak or da'if as far as their narration is concerned.

See also 
 Ijma
 Adiaphora
 Bid‘ah
 Ghulat
 Uli al-amr
 Verse of Obedience

References

Arabic words and phrases in Sharia
Islamic terminology
 
Islamic jurisprudence